Sandy Fussell (born 1960) is an Australian author best known for her works in children’s literature. Her second novel, Polar Boy, was selected as the National Reading Day book for primary school students in 2009.

Biography
Fussell began writing when one of her children had stopped reading, which initially took the form of a mother-son writing project. This was eventually abandoned as she was told to "go write your own book".

Fussell works as a computer programmer and is passionate about using technology to encourage children to read and write. Her website, Samurai Kids, has been archived by the National Library of Australia Pandora Project, which provides long-term access to Australian online publications of national significance.

Published works

Samurai Kids series
White Crane (2008) (ISBN 9781921150388)
Owl Ninja (2008) (ISBN 9780763657727)
Shaolin Tiger (2009) (ISBN 9781455845477)
Monkey Fist (2009) (ISBN 9781451749656)
Fire Lizard (2010) (ISBN 9781921529467)
Golden Bat (2011) (ISBN 9781921529474)
Red Fox (2012) (ISBN 9781922077509)
Black Tengu (2013) (ISBN 9781922077622)

Others
Ratbags (2008)
Polar Boy (2008)
Jaguar Warrior (2010)
Sad the Dog (2015)

Awards
2009 Short Listed CBCA Children's Book of the Year, Polar Boy
2009 Honour Book CBCA Junior Judges Project, Polar Boy
2009 Short Listed Sakura Medal Chapter Book (Japan), Samurai Kids Book 1 - White Crane
2009 Panda Book Award Middle Readers (China), Polar Boy
2010 CBCA Notable, Samurai Kids Book 3 - Shaolin Tiger
2010 Shortlist Speech Pathology Book of the Year, Samurai Kids Book 3 - Shaolin Tiger

References

Illawarra Mercury, The Weekender, Feature Article, 12 April 2008
CBCA Publications Short List Information 2009.
CBCA Publications Notable Australian Children's Books 2010.

External links

Sandy Fussell Official website
Samurai Kids Series Official website
Publishers website (Walker Books Australia)
CBCA Awards website
 Publishers website Candlewick Press
National Library of Australia Pandora Project

1960 births
Living people
21st-century Australian novelists
Australian children's writers
Australian women novelists
21st-century Australian women writers